The Chamber of Senators of Paraguay (Cámara de Senadores), the upper house of the National Congress, has 45 members, elected for a five-year term by proportional representation.

The Paraguayan bicameral legislature, which included the Senate, was formed in 1870. The Senate was abolished in 1940 and recreated in 1967.

Latest elections

Senate

List of senators
Senators (2013 - 2018):
 National Republican Association – Colorado Party
 Lilian Samaniego
 Luis Castiglioni
 Arnoldo Wiens
 Mirta Leonor Gusinky
 Julio César Velázquez
 Óscar Alberto González
 Gustavo Javier González
 Enrique Fausto Bachetta Chiriani
 Julio Antonio Quiñónez
 Silvio Adalberto Avelar Benítez
 Juan Carlos del Valle
 Javier Alejandro Osorio Núnez
 Blanca Ovelar
 Mario Abdo Benítez
 Oscar Rubén Fernández
 Víctor Bogado González
 Juan Darío Espínoza
 Carlos Núñez Agüero
 Nelson Dario Aguinagalde

 Authentic Radical Liberal Party
 Antonio Ramos
 Emilia Patricia Alfaro Franco
 Ramón Gómez
 Blanca Beatríz Fonseca
 Carlos Alberto Amarilla
 Enzo Cardozo Jiménez
 Ramona Gómez Cáceres
 Luís Alberto Lezcano
 Julio César Franco
 María Blanca González
 Miguel Carmona
 Fernando Silva
 Roberto Ramón Acevedo Quevedo

 Guasú Front
 Fernando Lugo
 Carlos Alberto Filizzola Pallarés
 Sixto Galeano
 Esperanza Martínez
 Oscar Hugo Richer Florentín

 Progressive Democratic Party
 Arnaldo Euclides Giuzzio
 Desiree Graciela Masi
 Pedro Arturo Cruz

 Avanza País
 Adolfo Marcelino Ferreiro
 Miguel Ángel López

 National Union of Ethical Citizens
 Jorge Oviedo
 José Manuel Bóbeda

 National Encounter Party
 Eduardo Romalino Petta

See also
List of presidents of the Senate of Paraguay

References

External links
  

Paraguay
Government of Paraguay
1870 establishments in Paraguay